Ingibjörg Skaptadóttir (1867 – 1945) was an Icelandic editor and publisher.

She founded, managed and published the monthly women's magazine Framsókn, in collaboration with her mother Sigríður Þorsteinsdóttir, between 1895 and 1899. The first women's magazine in Iceland, it placed focus on women's access to education and encouraged women them to demand and use their rights. She belonged to the first female editors, publishers and journalists in Iceland. She retired in 1899 and left her magazine to Jarþrúður Jónsdóttir and Ólafía Jóhannsdóttir.

References 

1867 births
1945 deaths
19th-century Icelandic people
19th-century Icelandic women
Icelandic journalists
Icelandic women journalists
19th-century journalists
Icelandic editors
Icelandic women editors
Icelandic publishers (people)